Kujang is a town in Kujang County, North Pyongan Province, North Korea. It is near Hyangsan. The Kujang station, broadcasting the radio programme Voice of Korea, is 25 km from the town, about 100 km north of Pyongyang.

References

  Kujang-ŭp from North Korean Human geography

North Pyongan
Towns in North Korea